Auguste Joseph Delécluse (1855–1928) was a French painter and educator, known for his still life and portraiture paintings. He founded the Académie Delécluse.

Biography 
Auguste Joseph Delécluse was born 23 April 1855 in Roubaix, France. He studied with Jean-Joseph Weerts, Carolus-Duran, and Paul-Louis Delance. Delécluse first participated in the Salon in 1880. The Académie Delécluse was an atelier-style art school in Paris founded by Auguste Joseph Delécluse in the late 19th century.

Delécluse died on 13 December 1928 in Paris.

References 

1855 births
1928 deaths
People from Roubaix
French still life painters
French salon-holders